Vera Dushevina was the defending champion but lost to Jarmila Groth in the quarterfinals.

Anastasia Pavlyuchenkova won the title, defeating Elena Vesnina in the final 5–7, 7–5, 6–4.

Seeds

Main draw

Finals

Top half

Bottom half

References

İstanbul Cup
Istanbul Cup - Singles